This is a list of video games for the Xbox 360 video game console that have sold or shipped at least one million copies. The best-selling Xbox 360 game is Kinect Adventures!, which was bundled with the Kinect accessory, selling 24 million units.

As of December 2009, over 353.8million total copies of games had been sold for the Xbox 360.

List

Notes

References

 
Xbox 360